is a Japanese actor. He graduated from Hamana High School.

Hakamada was born in Hamamatsu, Shizuoka Prefecture. He is represented by Platinum Production. Hakamada's wife is tarento Ai Kawanaka.

Discography

Singles

Albums

Filmography

TV dramas

Films

Japanese dub

See also
Hideaki Itō (close friend)
Gamon Kaai (close friend)

References

External links
 – Platinum Production 
Asahi Beer Super Dry Films "Runner" 

Japanese male actors
People from Hamamatsu
Japanese men's futsal players
1973 births
Living people
Actors from Shizuoka Prefecture